Larry Mercey (born December 12, 1939) is a Canadian country music artist. best known as the lead singer of the 6-time Juno Winning Mercey Brothers band.

Early life
Mercey was born in Hanover, Ontario.

Career
Mercey was a member of the band The Mercey Brothers, who performed and recorded country music for 30 years, beginning in about 1960, and were signed to the RCA label. They were a regular act on the CKNX Barn Dance radio show and later on CKNX television. Larry Mercey wrote several of the group's hit songs.

After the Mercey Brothers band broke up, Mercey began a solo career, living in Waterloo, Ontario and fronting the Larry Mercey Trio with George Lonsbury and Al Alderson.

Mercey was nominated for Best Country Male Vocalist at the Juno Awards in 1991 and 1993. His 1993 single "If I'm Only Good for One Thing" reached the Top 20 of the RPM Country Tracks chart.

In 2011 Mercey co-wrote a song which was recorded by country singer Charlie Pride.

Discography

With the Mercey Brothers

Albums

Singles

References

External links

 

1939 births
Canadian country singer-songwriters
Canadian male singers
Living people
Canadian male singer-songwriters